Iowa is the thirty-first richest state in the United States of America, with a per capita income of $19,674 (2000).

Iowa Counties by Per Capita Income

Note: Data is from the 2010 United States Census Data and the 2006-2010 American Community Survey 5-Year Estimates.

References

United States locations by per capita income
Economy of Iowa
Income